Weberia is a genus of parasitic flies in the family Tachinidae. There are at least three described species in Weberia.

Species
These three species belong to the genus Weberia:
 Weberia digramma (Meigen, 1824)
 Weberia nodulosa (Ditlevsen, 1917)
 Weberia pustulata Horst, 1915

References

Further reading

 
 
 
 

Tachinidae
Articles created by Qbugbot